Maryscott (Scotty) Greenwood is a corporate director  and an American specialist in Canada/U.S. relations. She is a former political appointee in the Clinton Administration who currently holds the position of Partner in Crestview Strategy US LLC  and the Chief Executive Officer of the Canadian-American Business Council. Greenwood is an advocate for free trade and a frequent commentator on trade issues.

Greenwood was previously a Principal at Dentons, and recognized by the Hill Times in 2014 and 2022 as one of the Top 100 People Influencing Canadian Foreign Policy. She was also named one of the Top 50 influencing Canada’s foreign policy in 2021. On May 26, 2015, Greenwood appeared before the House of Commons Standing Committee on Foreign Affairs and International Development as part of its study of the 2015 North American Leaders Summit. On March 16, 2021, Greenwood appeared before the House of Commons Special Committee on the Economic Relationship between Canada and the United States. She is also the co-host of the Canusa Street podcast, produced by the Wilson Center and available on Spotify.

On August 16, 2021 Greenwood was presented with the Founder's Memorial Award from the Pacific NorthWest Economic Region at the 2021 Annual Summit in Big Sky, Montana. In January, 2022, the Ontario government named her as one of ten members of Premier Doug Ford's Council on U.S. Trade and Industry Competitiveness. In March 2022, The Hill Times named Greenwood one of the top 50 people influencing Canada’s foreign policy.

Previously, Greenwood held the position of Chief of Staff to former United States Ambassador to Canada, Gordon Giffin.

In March 2022, Greenwood, Arthur Milnes, and Scott Reid release the second edition of With Faith and Goodwill: Chronicling the Canada-U.S. Friendship, published by Dundurn Press. The book showcases the words and deeds of prime ministers, presidents, and others, from Sir John A. Macdonald to Joseph R. Biden, Jr. With rare photographs and long-forgotten treasures, this book looks back at a remarkable shared history and those who changed its course.

Current activities
 Board of Directors, Tilray
 Board of Directors, Foundation for Art and Preservation in Embassies
 Board of Directors, World Affairs Council of Washington, DC
 Board of Directors, McKenna Long & Aldridge Foundation
 Advisory Board, G(irls)20 Summit
 Chief Executive Officer, Canadian American Business Council
 Member, Premier’s Council on U.S. Trade and Industry Competitiveness 
 Partner, Crestview Strategy US LLC
 Working Group Member, The George W. Bush Institute – SMU Economic Growth Initiative, North America Working Group
 Managing Director (Secretariat), Exponent
 Board of Directors, Future Borders Coalition

Popular media
Regular appearances in Canadian and U.S. media outlets as an authority on Canada/U.S. relations.

 CBC News
 CTV News Channel
 The Globe and Mail
 iPolitics
 Maclean's
 Toronto Star
 Washington Post
C-SPAN
Dotcom Magazine
The Hill Times

References

Living people
Clinton administration personnel
Year of birth missing (living people)